is a 2009 film directed by Banmei Takahashi and starring Nakamura Kantarō II as Dogen, and Yuki Uchida as Orin. The story is based on the novel Eihei no kaze: Dōgen no shōgai written by Tetsuo Ōtani in 2001.

The film is a biography of Dōgen Zenji, a Japanese Zen Buddhist teacher. After travelling to China to study, Dogen founded the Sōtō school of Zen in Japan. The Buddhist Film Foundation described it as "a poignant, in-depth, reverent and surprisingly moving portrait of Eihei Dogen."

Reception
Russell Edwards of Variety described it as "The origins of a spiritual tradition are depicted with prerequisite solemnity and a pleasing veneer of arthouse showmanship." Mark Schilling, writing for The Japan Times, gave the film three and a half stars and described it as a "rare serious film about this form of Buddhism, which has had a huge cultural influence but is little understood — let alone practiced — by ordinary Japanese."

Release
The film premiered in Japan in 2009. The following year, it had its US debut at the International Buddhist Film Festival.
The film was released on DVD and includes a short documentary entitled The Zen of Dogen with Kazuaki Tanahashi.

References

External links 
 
 

2009 films
Films directed by Banmei Takahashi
Films about Buddhism
Biographical films about religious leaders
Japanese biographical films
Films set in China
Films set in Japan
Films set in Kyoto
Films set in feudal Japan
Films set in the 13th century
Dōgen
2000s biographical films
2000s Japanese-language films
2000s Japanese films